Evgueni Smirnov (born 16 December 1982) is a Russian former professional tennis player.

Smirnov had best world rankings of 388 in singles and 233 in doubles. His only ATP Tour main draw appearance came in the doubles event at the 2005 Kremlin Cup, where he made it through to the quarter-finals (with Philipp Mukhometov). He won one singles and nine doubles titles on the ITF Futures circuit during his career.

ITF Futures titles

Singles: (1)

Doubles: (9)

References

External links
 
 

1982 births
Living people
Russian male tennis players